Naši i Vaši is a Croatian comedy TV series whose pilot episode aired in 2000 on HRT. The first season of the series had seven episodes, and the second and last season's 15 episodes counters.

Synopsis

Student of sociology Iva, with Herzegovinian Croat origin, and her colleague from faculty Neno, from Zagreb, announced to parents to marry because they are expecting a child. Both parents was opposed to the wedding, but when he finally gets to the marriage proposal, things go develop the unexpected.

The series "Naši i Vaši" is amusing but at the same time warm-hearted teasing mentality difference between citizens of Zagreb (Prigorians) and Herzegovinians. In the manner of quality folk humor follow link two young people who love and connect what is seemingly unrelated - his own family. We'll follow that love flirt of Franjo and Stana, Jure to sit the exams in Štef's school and later there fighting for business space, Milka that from Biba seeking fashion advice, and Iva and Neno who choose to be tenants. Eventually, the two will reunite families.

Episodes

Season 1 (2000/2001)
 S1E1 - Pilot (2000)
 S1E2 - Deda i baba (2001)
 S1E3 - Školovanje (2001)
 S1E4 - Moda (2001)
 S1E5 - Podstanari (2001)
 S1E6 - Zdravljak (2001)
 S1E7 - Promocija (2001)

Season 2 (2001/2002)
 S2E1 - Doček (31 December 2001)
 S2E2 - Adaptacija (30 March 2002)
 S2E3 - Bez imena (6 April 2002)
 S2E4 - Ročnik (13 April 2002)
 S2E5 - Neki to vole vruće (20 April 2002)
 S2E6 - Uskrs (27 April 2002)
 S2E7 - Mirovina (4 May 2002)
 S2E8 - Poduzeće (11 May 2002)
 S2E9 - Komadić sreće (25 May 2002)
 S2E10 - Virtuoz (1 June 2002)
 S2E11 - Srebrni pir (8 June 2002)
 S2E12 - Prošnja (15 June 2002)
 S2E13 - Svadba (22 June 2002)
 S2E14 - Zajednički život (29 June 2002)
 S2E15 - Garsonijera (6 July 2002)

Cast

Main cast

Guest appearances
 Season 1 (2000-2001) 
in alphabetical order
 Ecija Ojdanić - Lucija "Luce"
 Josip Zovko - Jozo
 Ksenija Prohaska - Ljubica
 Marko Svaguša - Švabo 
 Mijo Pavelko - vlasnik restorana
 Relja Bašić - stric Miško
 Vida Jerman - Barbara
 Vladimir Krstulović - ravnatelj

 Season 2 (2001-2002) 
 Barbara Rocco - Barbara
 Boris Svrtan - doktor Marijan
 Damir Markovina - Vjera
 Danko Ljuština - doktor
 Dora Fišter - medicinska sestra
 Dražen Kühn - Čuček
 Ecija Ojdanić - Lucija "Luce"
 Goran Grgić - pater Marko
 Ivana Bolanča - crnka
 Ivana Buljan Legati - voditeljica
 Ivo Gregurević - doktor Jozo
 Jasna Palić-Picukarić - Sanjica
 Josip Zovko - Jozo
 Joško Ševo - ravnatelj
 Kraljevi ulice - Grgini dečki
 Maja Kuljiš - hostesa kviza "Komadić sreće"
 Marina Nemet - profesorica
 Mario Orešković - spiker
 Marko Svaguša - nećak
 Matija Prskalo - Mila
 Milan Štrljić - inspektor
 Nada Klašterka - penzionerka
 Nenad Cvetko - professor #2
 Nikola Novosel - kupac Miško
 Oliver Mlakar - voditelj kviza "Komadić sreće"
 Relja Bašić - Miško
 Severina Vučković - Severina
 Slavko Hita - pijanac Pero
 Stojan Matavulj - Milin muž
 Tarik Filipović - prosjak-voditelj
 Tomislav Kovačević - ulični svirač
 Zoran Čubrilo - professor #1
 Zvonimir Jelačić Bužimski - penzioner Leo

References

External links
 

2000s Croatian television series
Croatian comedy television series
2000 Croatian television series debuts
2002 Croatian television series endings
Croatian Radiotelevision original programming